Kenya competed at the 2014 Summer Youth Olympics, in Nanjing, China from 16 August to 28 August 2014.

Athletics

Kenya qualified 11 athletes.

Qualification Legend: Q=Final A (medal); qB=Final B (non-medal); qC=Final C (non-medal); qD=Final D (non-medal); qE=Final E (non-medal)

Boys
Track & road events

Girls
Track & road events

Rugby Sevens

Kenya qualified a boys' team based on its performance at the 2013 Rugby World Cup Sevens.

Boys' Tournament

Roster

 Daniel Abuonji
 Brian Gisemba
 Edgar Khafumi
 Lamech Kimutai
 Brian Mokua
 John Ochar
 Alex Olaba
 Bill Omondi
 Ian Onyango
 Nelson Sangura
 Paul Songoi
 Keith Wasike

Group Stage

Semifinal

Bronze Medal Match

Weightlifting

Kenya was given a reallocation spot to compete.

Boys

References

2014 in Kenyan sport
Nations at the 2014 Summer Youth Olympics
Kenya at the Youth Olympics